Mrs. Sándor Nagy (born 11 May 1979) is a retired Hungarian Paralympic judoka. She was Hungary's first female Paralympic judoka to win a medal. She is a World and European Champion in the heavyweight category.

References

1979 births
Living people
People from Vác
Paralympic judoka of Hungary
Judoka at the 2004 Summer Paralympics
Medalists at the 2004 Summer Paralympics
Sportspeople from Pest County
Hungarian female judoka
21st-century Hungarian women